Dacrycarpus steupii is a species of conifer in the family Podocarpaceae.

Characteristics
Dacrycarpus steupii can grow up to the average height of about 35 m, but it is common to see them stunted in growth. The outer bark is black to dark brown while the inner bark is reddish brown to pink. The bark also peels of in small flakes. The male flowers cannot be seen. Female cones can be found on long, elongate leaves. The needles on the branches are widespread.

Location and range
It is found only in Indonesia. In Kalimantan, Dacrycarpus steupii was known from a population near Balikpapan that is now extinct. It is possible that it is widespread through New Guinea in the Latimodjong Mountains.

Population
It is threatened by habitat loss and modern agricultural growth.

References

steupii
Near threatened plants
Taxonomy articles created by Polbot